Miss Universe Thailand 2020 was the 21st edition of Miss Universe Thailand pageant. It was held on October 10, 2020 at the True Icon Hall of Iconsiam. Paweensuda Drouin, Miss Universe Thailand 2019, crowned Amanda Obdam as her successor at the end of the event. Obdam represented Thailand at the Miss Universe 2020 competition and finished as a Top 10 semifinalist.

Results

Placements
Color keys

Awards

Special awards

Golden Tiara

Popular Vote Wildcard

Speech Wildcard

Portrait Wildcard

Swimsuit Wildcard

Miss Perfect Skin

Best in National Costume

Best in Evening Gown

Contestants 
29 contestants competed for the title of Miss Universe Thailand 2020.

Notes

Crossovers and returnees 
Contestants who previously competed in previous editions of Miss Universe Thailand and other local and international beauty pageants with their respective placements:

Provincial Pageants

Miss Sisaket
 2020: Baralee Ruamrak (Winner)

Miss Chiang Mai
 2020: Alexandra Hänggi (Winner)

Miss Prachuap Khiri Khan
 2019: Kanyanut Numnaree (Winner)

Miss Grand Bangkok
 2018: Chanakarn Suksatit
 2020: Piyathida Phothong (2nd Runner Up)
 2020: Thidapon Ketthong (2nd Runner Up)

Miss Grand Khon Kaen
 2020: Wichuda Kamyos (Top 10)

Miss Grand Chaiyaphum
 2020: Wichuda Kamyos (1st Runner Up)

Miss Grand Chanthaburi
2017: Thaweeporn Phingchamrat (Winner)

Miss Grand Nakhon Pathom
 2017: Natthapat Pongpraphan (Winner)

Miss Grand Nakhon Ratchasima
 2019: Manatsawee Nilbula

Miss Grand Phuket
 2016: Amanda Obdam (Winner)

Miss Grand Nan
2019: Kanyanut Numnaree (1st Runner-up)

Miss Grand Mukdahan
 2020: Wichuda Kamyos (1st Runner Up)

Miss Grand Yasothon
 2019: Manatsawee Nilbula

Miss Grand Ratchaburi
 2016: Kanyanut Numnaree
 2017: Kanyanut Numnaree
 2018: Kanyanut Numnaree (1st Runner Up)

Miss Grand Songkhla
 2018: Radamanee Kanjanarat (1st Runner-up)

Miss Grand Sukhothai
 2018: Thidapon Ketthong (Winner)

Miss Grand Ubon Ratchathani
 2020: Baralee Ruamrak 

Miss Supranational Bangkok
 2018-19: Chanakarn Suksatit

Miss Supranational Songkhla
 2019: Radamanee Kanjanarat (Winner)

National Pageants

Miss Teen Thailand
 2016: Emmy Kym Sawyer (2nd Runner Up)

Miss Thailand
 2020: Kanyanut Numnaree 
 2020: Natthapat Pongpraphan (Winner)
 2020: Patita Suntivijj (4th Runner-up)
 2020: Praewatchara Schmid (Top 16)

Miss Thailand World
 2015: Amanda Obdam (Top 10)
 2018: Praewwanich Ruangthong (1st Runner-up)

Miss Universe Thailand
 2013: Punika Kulsoontornrut
2013: Wanvisa Maya Goldman (2nd Runner Up)
2017: Jareerat Petchsom (Top 10)
2018: Praveenar Singh (2nd Runner-up)
2019: Patita Suntivijj (Top 10)
2019: Chanakarn Suksatit
2019: Nuttha Thongkaew
2019: Praewatchara Schmid (Top10)
2019: Pimnada Kittivisarnvong

Miss Grand Thailand
 2016: Amanda Obdam (Top 10)
 2017: Thaweeporn Phingchamrat (3rd Runner-up)
 2017: Natthapat Pongpraphan
 2018: Thidapon Ketthong

Miss Supranational Thailand
 2019: Radamanee Kanjanarat (Runner Up - Miss Thailand Ambassadress of the World)

Miss Tourism World Thailand
 2020: Jareerat Petchsom (Top 10)
 2020: Kanyanut Numnaree

Miss Model Thailand
 2018 Kanyanut Numnaree (2nd Runner Up)

Miss Earth Thailand
 2013: Punika Kulsoontornrut (Winner)

Miss Thinn Thai Ngarm
 2018: Praewwanich Ruangthong (1st Runner-up)

International Pageants

Miss International
 2014: Punika Kulsoontornrut (2nd Runner Up)

Miss Supranational
 2021: Benjarat Akkarawanichsil Aebi (Top 24 (21st))

Miss Earth
 2013: Punika Kulsoontornrut (2nd Runner-up)

Miss United Continent
 2017: Thaweeporn Phingchamrat (3rd Runner-up)

Miss Tourism Metropolitan International
 2016: Amanda Obdam (Winner)

Miss Cosmo World
 2017: Natthapat Pongpraphan (Winner)

Ambassador & Ambassadress of the World
 2019: Radamanee Kanjanarat (No Pageant Held)

References

External links
 

2018
2020 in Bangkok
2020 beauty pageants
Beauty pageants in Thailand
October 2020 events in Thailand